Odelvis Dominico Speek (born May 6, 1977) is a male volleyball player from Cuba, who plays as a middle-blocker for the Men's National Team. He became Best Blocker at the first 2008 Olympic Qualification Tournament in Düsseldorf, where Cuba ended up in second place and missed qualification for the 2008 Summer Olympics in Beijing, PR China.

Honours
 2003 Pan American Games — 2nd place
 2005 America's Cup — 3rd place
 2007 NORCECA Championship — 3rd place
 2007 America's Cup — 3rd place
 2008 Olympic Qualification Tournament — 2nd place (did not qualify)

References
 FIVB biography

1977 births
Living people
Cuban men's volleyball players
Place of birth missing (living people)
Volleyball players at the 2003 Pan American Games
Volleyball players at the 2007 Pan American Games
Pan American Games silver medalists for Cuba
Pan American Games bronze medalists for Cuba
Pan American Games medalists in volleyball
Medalists at the 2003 Pan American Games
Medalists at the 2007 Pan American Games
21st-century Cuban people